The United States Bankruptcy Court for the Southern District of New York is the United States bankruptcy court within the United States District Court for the Southern District of New York.  The Southern District of New York is a major venue for bankruptcy, as it has jurisdiction over the corporate headquarters and major financial institutions located in Manhattan.

Originally, the District Court itself handled bankruptcies; these and admiralty court cases dominated nearly to the exclusion of all other cases, which were primarily handled by a Circuit Court for the District of New York and its successor Circuit Court for the Southern District of New York, until that court was abolished and its cases handled by the District Court as well.  The district became widely recognized for its expertise in handling large bankruptcies, leading companies to seek a way to file in this court.  Modern examples include the General Motors Chapter 11 reorganization and the Enron and WorldCom bankruptcies. 

From 1980 through 2014, the Southern District Bankruptcy Court for New York handled over 18% of all large, public-company bankruptcy filings in the United States while the Delaware District Bankruptcy Court handled nearly 36%.

List of judges
The following is a list of the bankruptcy judges for the United States Bankruptcy Court for the Southern District of New York.

See also
 United States District Court for the Southern District of New York
 List of judges of the United States District Court for the Southern District of New York

References

External links
 Official website

New York, Southern District
Manhattan
New York (state) law
Courts and tribunals with year of establishment missing